Ann and Eve is a 1970 Swedish-Yugoslav erotic drama film directed by Arne Mattsson and starring Gio Petré and Marie Liljedahl as the title characters. The film also stars Francisco Rabal.

Plot
An erotic drama about a youthful bride-to-be who takes a holiday to Yugoslavia with a cynical and evil lesbian film critic (and murderess) that leads to debauchery, degradation with a dwarf, a dinner with naked entertainers and other highlights.

Reception
Ann and Eve was a major commercial success. Released in the United States on August 3, 1970, the film grossed $18 million at the North American box office, making it the 17th highest-grossing film of 1970.

See also
 Cinema of Sweden
 Erotic film

References

External links
 

1970 films
Swedish erotic drama films
1970s erotic drama films
1970 drama films
1970s Swedish-language films
Films directed by Arne Mattsson
1970s Swedish films